Kansas City Brass was an American soccer team based in Kansas City, Missouri, United States. Founded in 1997, the team played in the USL Premier Development League (PDL), the fourth tier of the American Soccer Pyramid, in the Heartland Division of the Central Conference.

The team played its home games on the Stadium Field at the Overland Park Soccer Complex in nearby Overland Park, Kansas, where they played beginning in 2011. The team's colors were blue and white.

History

Kansas City Brass was owned by Kansas City United Soccer, Inc., a Kansas Not-for-Profit Corporation, formed in 1997 by Dr. Emilio John and Alan Blinzler, to serve two missions: to prepare graduating high school seniors for college soccer by introducing them to the level of speed and physical play found at the highest levels of college soccer; and to prepare players for the level of competition found at the First and Second Division levels of professional soccer. Since its beginning John served as President of the Brass and Blinzler acted as Chief Operating Officer.

The Brass assisted over thirty players in their quest to move from the amateur ranks to professional teams. In 2007 the Brass was inducted into the United Soccer Leagues Hall of Fame.

Players

Year-by-year

Head coaches
  Robi Goff (1998–1999)
  Jim Schwab (2000–2001)
  Jefferson Roblee (2002–2010)
 Burke Slusher (2002–2013) – associate head coach
  Lincoln Roblee (2011–2013)

Stadia
 Greene Stadium; Liberty, Missouri (2003–2010)
 Stadium at Liberty High School; Liberty, Missouri 2 games (2003)
 Blue Valley District Activity Center; Overland Park, Kansas 2 games (2003)
 Stadium at Excelsior Springs High School; Excelsior Springs, Missouri 3 games (2005–2006)
 Overland Park Soccer Complex; Overland Park, Kansas (2011–2013)

Average attendance
Attendance stats are calculated by averaging each team's self-reported home attendances from the historical match archive at https://web.archive.org/web/20100105175057/http://www.uslsoccer.com/history/index_E.html.

 2005: 114
 2006: 141
 2007: 202
 2008: 122
 2009: 128
 2010: 131

References

Association football clubs established in 1997
Sports in the Kansas City metropolitan area
Defunct Premier Development League teams
B
Soccer clubs in Missouri
USISL teams
1997 establishments in Missouri
Association football clubs disestablished in 2013
2013 disestablishments in Missouri